Dierama igneum, the fiery wandflower, is a species of flowering plant in the iris family Iridaceae, native to south east Africa. Evergreen in its native Africa, it may become herbaceous in colder regions. The trumpet shaped flowers are borne on long, arching stems, and are normally salmon pink in colour. The specific epithet igneum, meaning "glowing" or "fiery", may refer to these arching sprays of blooms.

The common name angel's fishing-rod attaches to all species of Dierama.

It is cultivated as an ornamental plant in temperate climates.

References

igneum
Flora of South Africa